The North Eastern Railway Class M1 (LNER Class D17/1) is a class of 4-4-0 steam locomotive, designed by Wilson Worsdell. 20 initial engines were built, then 30 further units were built, designated Class Q (LNER Class D17/2).

Classification
Classification was complex.  The NER initially classified these locomotives "M1" while a variant (with compound expansion) was classified "M".  The compound was later re-classified "3CC" and the "M1" was re-classified "M".

Under LNER ownership the "M" (formerly "M1") became LNER Class D17/1 and the "3CC" (formerly "M") became LNER Class D19.

This table summarises LNER classes D17, D18 and D19, which were all very similar:

 HP = high-pressure cylinder, LP = low-pressure cylinders

Accidents and incidents
On 4 October 1894, locomotive No. 1622 was one of two locomotives hauling a sleeping car train which overran signals and collided with a freight train that was being shunted at Castle Hills, Yorkshire. One person was killed.

On 14 February 1927, locomotive No. 1628 was hauling a passenger train that was in a head-on collision with another at  station, Yorkshire due to a signalman's error. Twelve people were killed and 24 were injured.

Withdrawal
The last two D17/1s were withdrawn in 1945.  Number 1629 was scrapped but number 1621 was saved for preservation.

No D17/1s passed into British Railways ownership.  Two D17/2s did (BR numbers 62111 and 62112) but they were withdrawn in February 1948.

Preservation
 D17/1 number 1621 is preserved at the National Railway Museum. It is now currently at the National Railway Museum in Shildon.

References

External links
 LNER Encyclopedia
 Photos of a model LNER Class D17
 North Eastern Railway Class M1 Eisenbahn in Großbritannien

M1
4-4-0 locomotives
2′B locomotives
Railway locomotives introduced in 1892
Standard gauge steam locomotives of Great Britain

Passenger locomotives